is a Japanese video game developer and a subsidiary of Nintendo based in Japan with offices in Tokyo and Sapporo. The majority of the company is made up of former employees of Hudson Soft. They have also been the developers of the Mario Party series since Mario Party 9 onwards.

History
The company was founded on March 1, 2000, as a joint venture between Nintendo and the biggest advertising firm in Japan called Dentsu, hence the "ND" in the name. Nintendo had at the time 78% of the shares of the company, while 13.3% of the shares were owned by Dentsu and the rest of the 8.7% were owned by other shareholders.

In 2010, Nintendo decided to buy out the company's shares from Dentsu and the other shareholders, being then the major shareholder on the company, with its changing from 78% to 96% initially and since 2015, to 97% of the shares.

Since 2010, many employees from Hudson Soft migrated to a restructured NDcube, which is also head by Hidetoshi Endo, a former president at Hudson Soft that assumed NDcube at the end of the 2000s.

In 2019, the director of Mario Party series since his Hudson Soft days, Shuichiro Nishiya, became president of the company in the place of Hidetoshi Endo, who was the president of NDcube for almost ten years.

Games

Notes

References

External links
 

Software companies based in Tokyo
Video game companies established in 2000
Japanese companies established in 2000
First-party video game developers
Video game companies of Japan
Nintendo divisions and subsidiaries
Video game development companies
Dentsu